Qualea is a flowering plant genus in the family Vochysiaceae. These plants occur in the Neotropics and their wood makes good timber and firewood and is used in construction.  Some species of Qualea have medicinal properties.

Species include:
 Qualea calantha
 Qualea cordata Spreng.
 Qualea dichotoma (Mart.) Warm. 
 Qualea elegans Taub.
 Qualea glauca Warm.
 Qualea grandiflora Mart.
 Qualea grandifolia Mart.
 Qualea impexa
 Qualea ingens Warm. – "arrayán" (Colombia)
 Qualea multiflora Mart.
 Qualea parviflora Mart.
 Qualea polychroma
 Qualea tessmannii

References

 
Flora of South America
Myrtales genera
Taxonomy articles created by Polbot